The Fourth Protocol is a 1987 British Cold War spy film starring Michael Caine and Pierce Brosnan. Directed by John Mackenzie, it is based on the 1984 novel The Fourth Protocol by Frederick Forsyth.

Plot 
In 1968, an East-West agreement is established to halt nuclear proliferation. One of its clauses, the Fourth Protocol, forbids the non-conventional delivery of a nuclear weapon to a target.

MI5 officer John Preston breaks into the residence of British government official George Berenson on New Year's Eve and finds a number of top secret NATO files that should not have been there. He reports his findings to high-ranking British Secret Service official Sir Nigel Irvine, who deals with the leak. Preston's unauthorised method of retrieving the documents embarrasses the acting Director of MI5, Brian Harcourt-Smith, and as punishment for his insubordination, Preston is relegated to lowly "Airports and Ports".

KGB officer Major Valeri Petrofsky is sent on a mission to the United Kingdom by General Govorshin, the head of the KGB. Govorshin's subordinate, Pavel Borisov, complains to his old friend General Yevgeny Karpov, about his department being stripped of resources and personnel, particularly his star officer Petrofsky. A surprised Karpov quietly investigates and learns about Petrofsky's unsanctioned mission – to violate the Fourth Protocol by assembling and detonating an atomic device as a false flag, to appear to be an American nuclear accident at a nearby military base, intended to strain British-US relations and strengthen the anti-nuclear movement in advance of an election in favour of the Soviet Union.

In Glasgow, a Soviet sailor is struck by a truck while fleeing from a port guard. Among the dead man's possessions, Preston finds a disk of polonium, which could only be useful as a component of a detonator for a bomb. He informs Harcourt-Smith, but is promptly suspended, as Harcourt-Smith believes that Preston is manufacturing a fake incident to work his way back into MI5. Preston, however has the confidence of Sir Bernard Hemmings, the gravely-ill Director of MI5, as well as Irvine, who is happy to sidestep Harcourt-Smith's directives. Preston sets to work and eventually comes across Winkler, a known Czech KGB agent, and tails him from the airport.

Meanwhile, Petrofsky meets KGB agent Irina Vassilievna, a bomb expert who is pretending to be his wife. Under her guidance, they assemble the device from the smuggled items and she sets it on a two-hour delay as they agreed on. Unbeknownst to Petrofsky, Vassilievna follows her own orders, resetting the delay to zero. After having sex with Petrofsky, she finds his own secret order to eliminate her and tries to warn him about the double-cross, but he kills her before she can.

Afterwards, Petrofsky is observed contacting Winkler. Preston tracks him to Ipswich, loses him, then finds him again. Preston eventually realises that Petrofsky's target is RAF Baywaters, and locates Petrofsky's house, which lies right next to the base.

When Petrofsky starts to activate the bomb, on an impulse, he checks the timer first and realises he has been betrayed. At that moment, an SAS team storms the house and during a struggle, Preston subdues and disables Petrofsky. To Preston's outrage, one of the SAS team cold-bloodedly shoots and kills Petrofsky, explaining bluntly afterwards that he had orders to do so.

At Hemmings' funeral, Preston is unsurprised to find Irvine secretly meeting with General Karpov. Preston had become suspicious when known KGB agent Winkler was used as a courier, making it easy to follow him, and also when Petrofsky was killed instead of being captured for questioning. He surmised that discrediting Govorshin would benefit both Irvine and Karpov (sneering to both that keeping hold over their careers is all that matters to them). Preston does not see any point in exposing them and leaves after expressing his contempt for their cynical power play (Irvine secretly assuring Karpov that they have control over Preston, as they covertly observe him reunite with his young son).

Cast 

 Michael Caine as John Preston
 Pierce Brosnan as Major Valeri Alekseyevich Petrofsky / James Edward Ross
 Ned Beatty as General Pavel Petrovich Borisov
 Joanna Cassidy as Irina Vassilievna
 Julian Glover as Brian Harcourt-Smith
 Michael Gough as Sir Bernard Hemmings
 Ray McAnally as General Yevgeny Sergeyevich Karpov
 Ian Richardson as Sir Nigel Irvine
 Anton Rodgers as George Berenson
 Caroline Blakiston as Angela Berenson
 Joseph Brady as Carmichael
 Matt Frewer as Tom McWhirter
 Betsy Brantley as Eileen McWhirter
 Sean Chapman as Captain Lyndhurst
 Alan North as General Govorshin
 Ronald Pickup as Wynne-Evans
 John Horsley as Sir Anthony Plumb
 Michael Bilton as Kim Philby
 Peter Cartwright as Jan Marais
 Aaron Schwartz as Gregoriev
 Mark Rolston as Russian Decoder
 Michael J. Jackson as Major Pavlov
 Matthew Marsh as Barry Banks
 Jerry Harte as Professor Krylov

Production
Michael Caine read the draft manuscript of the novel and suggested to Forsyth that they produce a film together. They hired George Axelrod to write a script and John Frankenheimer to direct, but were unable to raise finance. Axelrod and Frankenheimer left the project, Forsyth wrote the script himself and they got a new producer and director.

Locations 
Much of the film was shot in the Heelands district of Milton Keynes, the main house featured is on Tranlands Brigg, Heelands, Milton Keynes. Scenes set on the London Underground were shot at Charing Cross, Green Park, and Aldwych stations. Colchester Station was also used in one scene, with star Michael Caine filmed standing on the tracks.  For some of the interiors, rooms of King's College London on the Strand were used. The "RAF Baywaters" scenes were filmed at the now defunct RAF Upper Heyford as a take on the real life RAF Bentwaters. Filming also took place in Finland. Towards the end of the film, the car chase in Ipswich is actually shot in Chelmsford on the A1016 Chelmer Valley bypass which at the time was newly built. One shot shows helicopters flying under the Orwell Bridge which is often considered a local landmark.

Eastbourne Mews, W2, was used as the filming location for John Preston's (Michael Caine) house.

Differences from the novel 
 The film opens with the killing of Kim Philby, who has already planned the operation, because he knows too much. In the book, he remains a key figure. 
 The film begins with Preston breaking into Berenson's house to expose him as a traitor. In the novel, Jim Rawlings, a professional thief, robs Berenson's flat of jewellery. In the process, he discovers illegal copies of classified documents in a briefcase. As a patriotic citizen, he takes them and sends them anonymously to MI5. The character of Rawlings is omitted from the film and the side plot of the disposal of the stolen jewellery is not pursued. In the film, the jewellery is taken by Preston, and returned to Berenson by Irvine. In the novel, the jewellery is broken down by Rawlings's fence and later taken from the diamond polisher working for the fence after he is tortured and killed. Berenson's contacts have a replica made of the jewellery using zirconium stones and later permanently deposits them with his bank.
 The political plot of the book to enable the Labour Party to win the general election and allow for a communist takeover of the party was left out.
 The film removes a large section of the book in regard to Preston's investigation into Jan Marais in South Africa.
 The character of the assembler in the book is a man, although the surname is the same. He is killed by getting his neck broken in a forest rather than being shot in bed.
 In the novel, the Soviet sailor is attacked by street thugs and later commits suicide by jumping from the top floor of a hospital, while in the movie he is hit by a truck.
 In the book the story about Berenson is linked to the atomic plot because it provides a way for Irvine to send a false message to Karpov suggesting the operation is blown. Karpov, fearful of a scandal then sends Winkler, his worst agent, to help Preston find Petrofsky, hoping that in exchange Irvine will ensure any scandal will be suppressed. The theme is of backchannels between individuals in opposing intelligence services working to counter dangerous opportunism within their governments. The end of the film implies Irvine and Karpov have a much more cynical collaboration simply to help their careers.
 Sir Nigel Irvine is a much more positively-presented character in the book, where he supports Preston because he genuinely respects his abilities, has Petrofsky killed to undercut the KGB without going to war (and in the book, Preston accepts this with mild disappointment instead of the sheer anger he shows in the film), and arranges for Preston to get lucrative private-sector work so he can win sole custody of his young son. 
 Brian Harcourt-Smith is a jerk in both the film and book, but the movie ignores him for the entire third act. In the book, his mishandling of the situation with Petrofsky leads the senior MI-5 leaders to nix his appointment as Director-General, and he angrily resigns to take a job at a bank.

Reception

Box office
The film debuted at no. 4 at the box office with $3.6 million in ticket sales.

In the UK it made £766,413.

Critical response
Rotten Tomatoes retrospectively gave the film a score of 67% based on reviews from 21 critics.

The Globe and Mail'''s film critic Jay Scott said that "the movie is entertaining on a rudimentary, never-to-be-taken-seriously level. On the rare occasions when it does rise above the material, it's because Pierce Brosnan is chillingly effective as an assassin with the body temperature of a snake. The yarn is otherwise little more than Mission Impossible tightly re-wound for the age of glasnost." Scott praised Michael Caine's excellent performance, but complained that the "role permits him to display only one of the three dimensions he was able to provide in his portrayal of the father in The Whistle Blower (1986)."Halliwell's Film and Video Guide described it as a "very competent but somehow old hat espionage thriller", awarding it one star from a possible four. Quoted in Halliwell's guide, Daily Variety stated that "there is an uneasy feeling that the whole affair could have been better made into an excellent miniseries". John Ferguson awarded it two stars out of five for Radio Times'', stating "what once made for diverting summer reading now appears tired and not particularly relevant".

References

External links 
 
 
 
 

1987 films
1987 independent films
1980s spy thriller films
British independent films
British spy thriller films
Cold War spy films
Films about nuclear war and weapons
Films about the Secret Intelligence Service
Films scored by Lalo Schifrin
Films based on British novels
Films based on thriller novels
Films based on works by Frederick Forsyth
Films directed by John Mackenzie (film director)
Films set in England
Films set in London
Films shot at EMI-Elstree Studios
Films shot in England
Films shot in Finland
Milton Keynes
MI5 in fiction
Techno-thriller films
Cultural depictions of the Cambridge Five
Films shot in London
Films about the KGB
Films set in Glasgow
Films set around New Year
Films shot in Buckinghamshire
Films shot in Essex
1980s English-language films
1980s British films